These are the Billboard magazine number-one albums of 1969, per the Billboard 200.

Iron Butterfly's In-A-Gadda-Da-Vida was the best performing album of 1969 despite not reaching number one at any point during the year. The album peaked at #4 on August 9, 1969.

Chart history

See also
1969 in music
List of number-one albums (United States)

References

1969
United States Billboard Albums